Mike Edwards (born February 15, 1957) is a former American football player. He was acquired by the Jacksonville Bulls prior to 1985 season. He played with Michigan Panthers the previous 2 years, recording 25 tackles in 1983 and 28 stops in 1984. Edwards was a 4-year letterman at Oklahoma State. He saw action in the Tangerine Bowl and Hula Bowl games.

References

External links
Just Sports Stats

1957 births
Living people
Players of American football from Florida
American football linebackers
African-American players of American football
Oklahoma State Cowboys football players
Michigan Panthers players
Jacksonville Bulls players
People from Plant City, Florida
21st-century African-American people
20th-century African-American sportspeople